In mathematics, a Galois extension is an algebraic field extension E/F that is normal and separable; or equivalently, E/F is algebraic, and the field fixed by the automorphism group Aut(E/F) is precisely the base field F. The significance of being a Galois extension is that the extension has a Galois group and obeys the fundamental theorem of Galois theory.

A result of Emil Artin allows one to construct Galois extensions as follows: If E is a given field, and G is a finite group of automorphisms of E with fixed field F, then E/F is a Galois extension.

Characterization of Galois extensions
An important theorem of Emil Artin states that for a finite extension  each of the following statements is equivalent to the statement that  is Galois:

 is a normal extension and a separable extension.
 is a splitting field of a separable polynomial with coefficients in 
 that is, the number of automorphisms equals the degree of the extension.

Other equivalent statements are:

 that is, the number of automorphisms is at least the degree of the extension.
 is the fixed field of a subgroup of 
 is the fixed field of 

Examples
There are two basic ways to construct examples of Galois extensions.

Adjoining to the rational number field the square root of 2 gives a Galois extension, while adjoining the cubic root of 2 gives a non-Galois extension. Both these extensions are separable, because they have characteristic zero. In fact, it has no automorphism other than the identity, because it is contained in the real numbers and  has just one real root. For more detailed examples, see the page on the fundamental theorem of Galois theory.

An algebraic closure  of an arbitrary field  is Galois over  if and only if  is a perfect field.

Notes

Citations

References

Further reading 

 (Galois' original paper, with extensive background and commentary.)

  (Chapter 4 gives an introduction to the field-theoretic approach to Galois theory.)
 (This book introduces the reader to the Galois theory  of Grothendieck, and some generalisations, leading to Galois groupoids.)

.   English translation (of 2nd revised edition):  (Later republished in English by Springer under the title "Algebra".)

Galois theory
Algebraic number theory
Field extensions